Stenopelmatus is one of two genera of large, flightless insects referred to commonly as Jerusalem crickets (or "potato bugs"). They are primarily native to Central America, and one species is known from Ecuador.

Classification 
There are 19 species recognized as valid in the genus Stenopelmatus, as presently recognized (with 13 more of uncertain status and potentially not valid), though the genus was formerly much larger, including most of the species now placed in the genus Ammopelmatus. The family Stenopelmatidae contains several Old World genera, but only the genera in the subfamily Stenopelmatinae (all New World) are referred to as Jerusalem crickets.

Valid species 
Stenopelmatus ater
Stenopelmatus chiapas
Stenopelmatus cusuco
Stenopelmatus diezmilpies
Stenopelmatus durango
Stenopelmatus ecuadorensis
Stenopelmatus faulkneri
Stenopelmatus honduras
Stenopelmatus hondurasito
Stenopelmatus mineraldelmonte
Stenopelmatus nuevoleon
Stenopelmatus perote
Stenopelmatus piceiventris
Stenopelmatus saltillo
Stenopelmatus sanfelipe
Stenopelmatus sartorianus
Stenopelmatus talpa
Stenopelmatus typhlops
Stenopelmatus zimapan

Uncertain status 
Stenopelmatus calcaratus
Stenopelmatus erythromelas
Stenopelmatus guatemalae
Stenopelmatus histrio
Stenopelmatus lessonae
Stenopelmatus lycosoides
Stenopelmatus mexicanus
Stenopelmatus minor
Stenopelmatus nieti
Stenopelmatus sallei
Stenopelmatus sumichrasti
Stenopelmatus toltecus
Stenopelmatus vicinus

Communication 
Similar to true crickets, each species of Jerusalem cricket produces a different song during mating. This song takes the form of a characteristic drumming in which the insect beats its abdomen against the ground.

No species have wings with sound-producing structures; moreover, evidently none has structures it could use to hear sound. This contrasts with true crickets and katydids, who use their wings to produce sounds and have hearing organs to sense sounds of others. Jerusalem crickets seem unable to hiss by forcing air through their spiracles, as some beetles and cockroaches do. Instead, the few Jerusalem crickets that do make sound rub their hind legs against the sides of the abdomen, producing a rasping, hissing noise. This hiss may serve to deter predators rather than to communicate with other crickets. For such purposes, Jerusalem crickets rely on substrate vibrations felt by subgenual organs located in all six of the insect's legs.

Size and shape 
Female Stenopelmatus talpa, also known as the Mexican Jerusalem cricket, are generally larger than males; prothorax width, prothorax length, fore femur, head size, and mandible length, are greater in females than males. However, males tended to have larger hind femora compared to females.

Notes

References

External links 

Ensifera genera
Stenopelmatoidea